WMUU-LP (102.9 FM) is a radio station. Licensed to Madison, Wisconsin, United States, the station serves the Madison, Wisconsin area.

On August 6, 2019, an application was filed with the Federal Communications Commission to transfer the WMUU license to Cow-Power Media Productions Co.; the station will continue in perpetuity to broadcast First Unitarian Society of Madison services. The assignment of the license was consummated on December 9, 2021.

References

External links
 

MUU-LP
MUU-LP
Radio stations established in 2015
2015 establishments in Wisconsin